Moritz Oppelt (born 4 February 1989) is a German politician for the CDU and since 2021 member of the Bundestag, the federal diet.

Life and politics 

Oppelt was born 1989 in the West German city of Heidelberg and studied law and economics at the University of Mannheim.

Oppelt entered the CDU in 2007 and was elected directly to the Bundestag in 2021.

References 

Living people
1989 births
Politicians from Heidelberg
Christian Democratic Union of Germany politicians
Members of the Bundestag 2021–2025
21st-century German politicians